Periklis Dorkofikis (born August 30, 1980) is a Greek former professional basketball player. At a height of 2.07 m (6'9 ") tall, he played at the power forward and center positions.

Professional career
During his pro career, Dorkofikis played in the Greek top-tier level GBL, the Italian top-tier level LBA, and the European-wide top-tier level EuroLeague.

National team career
Dorkofikis played with the junior national teams of Greece at the 1998 FIBA Europe Under-18 Championship, where he won a bronze medal, at the 1999 FIBA Under-19 World Cup, and the 2000 FIBA Europe Under-20 Championship. He also won a silver medal with Greece's under-26 selection at the 2001 Mediterranean Games.

References

External links
Euroleague.net Profile
Draftexpress.com Profile
Eurobasket.com Profile
FIBA Archive Profile
FIBA Europe Profile
Greek League Profile 
Hellenic Federation Profile 
Italian League Profile 

1980 births
Living people
AEK B.C. players
Amyntas B.C. players
Centers (basketball)
Competitors at the 2001 Mediterranean Games
Greek men's basketball players
Greek Basket League players
Ilysiakos B.C. players
Ionikos N.F. B.C. players
Mediterranean Games medalists in basketball
Mediterranean Games silver medalists for Greece
Olympiacos B.C. players
Olympias Patras B.C. players
Pallacanestro Reggiana players
Panelefsiniakos B.C. players
Papagou B.C. players
Peristeri B.C. players
Power forwards (basketball)
Rethymno B.C. players
S.S. Felice Scandone players
Basketball players from Athens